Saint-André-d'Embrun (literally Saint-André of Embrun) is a commune in the Hautes-Alpes department in southeastern France. Surrounded by the towns of Chateauroux-les-Alpes, Embrun and Crévoux, Saint-André-d'Embrun is located 36 km northeast of Gap, the largest city nearby.

Population

See also
Communes of the Hautes-Alpes department

References

Communes of Hautes-Alpes